Katakuti may refer

Katakuti, is a village development committee in Dolakha District, Nepal
Katakuti (web series), is a Bengali language web series released in 2022